The 2001 Speedway World Cup Final was the fifth and last race of the 2001 Speedway World Cup season. It took place on 7 July 2001 in the Olympic Stadium in Wrocław, Poland.

Australian rider Jason Crump became the first rider since the legendary Swedish rider Ove Fundin in the inaugural Speedway World Team Cup in 1960 to go through the entire tournament (including qualification rounds) undefeated.

Results

Heat details

Heat after heat 
 Crump, Hancock, Cegielski, N.Pedersen, Nilsen
 Hamill, Wiltshire, Protasiewicz, B.Pedersen, M.Karlsson(x2)
 T.Gollob, Boyce, Rickardsson, Werner, Clausen
 Sullivan, Klingberg, Jensen, Janniro, Ułamek(T)
 Jonsson, Adams, B.Andersen(joker), Krzyżaniak, Cook
 Jonsson, Hamill, Cegielski, Clausen, Sullivan
 Adams, Nilsen, Jensen, Protasiewicz, Werner
 Crump, T.Gollob, B.Andersen, M.Karlsson, Janniro
 Ułamek, Rickardsson, N.Pedersen, Cook, Wiltshire
 T.Gollob(joker), Klingberg, N.Pedersen, Boyce, Hancock
 M.Karlsson, Boyce, Cook, Cegielski, Jensen
 Sullivan, Rickardsson, Hancock, Protasiewicz, B.Andersen
 T.Gollob, N.Pedersen, Adams, Hamill, Klingberg(e5)
 Crump, B.Pedersen, Ułamek, Werner, Jonsson(wu)
 Nilsen, Wiltshire, Clausen, Krzyżaniak, Hancock
 Rickardsson, Adams, Cegielski, B.Pedersen, Janniro
 Crump, Klingberg, Protasiewicz, B.Pedersen, Cook(e5)
 T.Gollob, Hancock, Wiltshire, Jonsson, Jensen
 Ułamek, Hamill, B.Andersen, Boyce, Nilsen
 N.Pedersen, Krzyżaniak, Sullivan, M.Karlsson, Cook
 Cegielski, B.Andersen, Wiltshire, Klingberg, Hamill(joker-e3)
 N.Pedersen, Protasiewicz, M.Karlsson, Boyce, Janniro
 T.Gollob, Sullivan, Cook, B.Pedersen, Nilsen(e5)
 Adams, Ułamek, Clausen, Hancok, M.Karlsson
 Crump, Rickardsson, Hamill, Jensen, Krzyżaniak(wu)

See also 
 Motorcycle speedway

References 

!